Hades (foaled 7 November 1996) also known as Helene Vitality is a Thoroughbred racehorse who, when he won the New Zealand Derby in 1999, gave trainer Roger James
his third Derby win in five years.

He had only won 1 race going into the Derby, a maiden race at Awapuni at his first start, but had run well in strong company since including a second-placing in the Avondale Guineas.

Following his Derby win he travelled to Australia and finished a good third in the Group 1 Cadbury Guineas behind Pins and Freemason before being sold to Hong Kong. He raced for the remainder of his career as Helene Vitality, winning HK$12,696,550 in 38 starts there.

References

1996 racehorse births
Racehorses bred in New Zealand
Racehorses trained in New Zealand
Thoroughbred family 1-a